Georgia State Route 26 Spur may refer to:

 Georgia State Route 26 Spur (Hawkinsville): A former spur route that existed completely in Hawkinsville
 Georgia State Route 26 Spur (Savannah Beach): A former spur route that existed completely in Savannah Beach, the former name for Tybee Island

026 Spur